The 1896 Lafayette football team represented Lafayette College in the sport of American football during the 1896 college football season. The team was retroactively selected as the co-national champion by two selectors, the National Championship Foundation and Parke H. Davis.  Lafayette's national championship this season was one of the most surprising and dramatic in the early history of college football. Lafayette began its season by tying Princeton 0–0, the first tie in their series, and defeated West Virginia three times in three days by a combined score of 56–0.

At 4–0–1, Lafayette was set to meet the Penn Quakers on October 24 at Franklin Field. Penn, coached by George Washington Woodruff, was in the midst of a 34-game winning streak and was only guaranteeing Lafayette $150 for a game that would net $10,000. As an intense media war surrounded the game, Lafayette enrolled Fielding H. Yost, a tackle from West Virginia, who Lafayette had defeated in the final game of their series on October 17. With Yost, Charles Rinehart, and the inventor of the football helmet George Barclay on the field, Lafayette won 6–4. It was the first victory of a "small school" over one of the Big Four (Harvard–Yale–Penn–Princeton). Penn won its next 31 games. Lafayette closed its season with an 18–6 win over Navy. Following the season, Lafayette was recognized as national champions along with Princeton (10–0–1) and was the first national champion outside the Harvard–Yale–Princeton–Penn rotation prevalent during that era. However, absent from their 1896 schedule was the annual rivalry with Lehigh, which cancelled two games scheduled for November in protest over the eligibility and amateur status of Barclay, who had played professional baseball the previous summer.

Schedule

References

Lafayette
Lafayette Leopards football seasons
College football national champions
College football undefeated seasons
Lafayette football